USM Alger is an Algerian football club.

USM Alger may also refer to:

 USM Alger (basketball)
 USM Alger Swimming Team